Julius Janowsky (born 18 August 1930) is an Austrian diver. He competed in the men's 10 metre platform event at the 1952 Summer Olympics.

References

External links
 
 

1930 births
Living people
Austrian male divers
Olympic divers of Austria
Divers at the 1952 Summer Olympics
Place of birth missing (living people)